Nguyễn Thị Mai Anh (20 June 1930 – 15 October 2021), commonly known as Madame Nguyễn Văn Thiệu, served as First Lady of South Vietnam from 1967 to 1975.

She was the wife of Nguyễn Văn Thiệu, a Vietnamese general and politician, who served as President of the Republic of Vietnam from 1967 until his resignation in 1975.

Biography

Early life
Nguyễn Thị Mai Anh was born on June 20, 1930, in Mỹ Tho town, with saint's name Christine the seventh of ten children in a Catholic family. As her family were wealthy herbal medicine practitioners, she was greatly influenced by the feudal order and family especially in the way she treated people.

In her youth, she and her sister, Tám Hảo, often went to Saigon to study and visit relatives. Due to the family's acquaintance with pharmacist Huynh Van Xuan, who worked at the Trang Hai Apothecary Institute, the two sisters worked as pharmacists at the Roussell Apothecary Institute. Huynh Van Xuan worked as a matchmaker for Nguyễn Văn Thiệu. Mai Anh's uncle, Đặng Văn Quang, was in Da Lat with Thieu, so the relationship was quickly promoted. There were some obstacles because Mai Anh was a Catholic, while Thiệu was Buddhist. They officially wed in 1951. In 1958, Thiệu was baptized as a Catholic. Mai Anh and Thiệu had three children : two sons (Nguyễn Quang Lộc, Nguyễn Thiệu Long) and daughter (Nguyễn Thị Tuấn Anh).

First Lady of South Vietnam
From 1967 to 1975, her husband reached the peak of power. Unlike First Lady Trần Lệ Xuân, she did not participate in politics at all, but rather engaged in social activities. In 1972, an American working in Vietnam asked for permission to take the name of Mrs. Nguyễn Thi Mai Anh for an orchid Brassolaeliocattleya Mai Anh.

In 1969, she established the Women's Volunteer Service Organization towards calling for donations to build an infirmary for low classes and working completely free, certainly. So For-People Hospital was inaugurated at the end of 1971. The contemporary press identified it as the most ultramodern hospital in whole Southeast Asia. However, after April 30 sorrowful event, it has been expropriated to treat high-ranking officials by the new regime. Folks wrote satiric at verse it as "For-Official" hospital. Today it is called officially as the Unification Hospital. This was also a place where cured malaria from "Laotian officer" Mai Phúc in 1977, or afterwards future Cambodian Prime Minister Hun Sen.

A person who served in the Independence Palace under President Nguyễn Văn Thiệu commented that :I have always held a fondness for the President Madam. She always kept the simple lifestyle of a kind and tolerant woman of the Mekong Delta. To me, Mrs. Thiệu is more of a mother and a brave wife than a First Lady living in the pinnacle of power and luxury. She is typical of the type of woman who grew up in a family fully absorbed a Confucian education (although she is a Catholic) that we often see in Southern society in the 40s. Ms. Thiệu always radiate clarity and joy. She never questioned the behavior of subordinates. Every time we met, she always asked us about our health first, not having time for us to greet her. The special thing is that she never mentioned anything related to Mr. Thiệu's work with us. During my time working here, only once did I hear her complain to Mr. Thiệu in very mild words about a powerful figure at the Presidential Palace while I was standing beside him.

Later life
Prior to the Fall of Saigon, President Thiệu announced his resignation on television. The family left South Vietnam on 21 April 1975 to Taiwan. They later moved to London before settling in Boston, Massachusetts. Nguyễn Văn Thiệu died on 29 September 2001 of a stroke in the aftermath of September 11.

Madame Thiệu died on Friday, October 15, 2021, at her own residence in San Diego County, California.

Awards
 Honorary Recipient of the Grand Order of Mugunghwa (South Korea, 1969)

Memoirs

See also

Trần Lệ Xuân
Đinh Thúy Yến

Notes and references

Notes

References

Further reading

Bibliography
Max Hastings, Vietnam : An Epic Tragedy, 1945 - 1975, Harper Perennial, New York City, October 15, 2019.
馬克斯‧黑斯廷斯（原文作者），譚天（譯者），《越南啟示錄1945-1975：美國的夢魘、亞洲的悲劇》（上、下冊不分售），八旗文化，臺北市，2022/04/08。

External links
Photograph of Madame Thiệu at Independence Palace
Madame Thieu supporting the establishing of the Press Village in South Vietnam in 1971
Photographs of Madame Thiệu at her husband's funeral

1930 births
2021 deaths
People from Mỹ Tho
People from Foxborough, Massachusetts
Vietnamese Roman Catholics
Vietnamese emigrants to the United States
Vietnamese people of the Vietnam War
Women in the Vietnam War
Spouses of Vietnamese leaders